Holy Family with the Infant Saint John the Baptist is an oil on canvas painting by Spanish artist Murillo, created c. 1668-1670, now held in the Museum of Fine Arts in Budapest.

References

Paintings of the Holy Family
Paintings depicting John the Baptist
Paintings by Bartolomé Esteban Murillo
Paintings in the collection of the Museum of Fine Arts (Budapest)
1660s paintings